This is the list of International Olympic Committee (IOC) meetings.

Olympic Congresses

IOC Sessions
There has been a session during all Olympic Games except the 1900, 1904 and 1908 Summer Olympics and the 1924, 1928 and 1932 Winter Olympics.

See also 

 FIFA Congress

Notes and references

International Olympic Committee
IOC Meetings
 
Olympic Congress